The Death of the Virgin is an oil on oak panel by the Flemish painter Hugo van der Goes. Completed c 1472–80, it shows the Virgin Mary on her deathbed surrounded by the Twelve Apostles. The scene is borrowed from Jacobus de Voragine's thirteenth-century "Legenda aurea" which relates how the apostles were brought, at Mary's request, on clouds by angels to a house near Mount Zion to be with her in her final three days. On the third day Jesus appeared above her bed in a halo of light surrounded by angels to accept her soul at the point when his name was finally mentioned. Three days later he reappeared to accept her body.

History and description
Death of the Virgin was almost certainly painted on commission and along with his Monforte and Portinari altarpieces is one of van der Goes most important works. It is likely one of his last paintings finished before he died. According to art historian Till-Holger Borchert, the panel "belongs to the most impressive and artistically mature achievements of Early Netherlandish painting". According to Lorne Campbell, the painting is van der Goes' "most idiosyncratic masterpiece".

Mary is shown lying in a blue robe with a white headdress on a timber bed with her head resting on a white pillow against a headboard. Her skin is thin and pallid, her hands clasped in prayer. She is surrounded by the twelve apostles who crowd around her bed. Peter is dressed in the white robes of a priest and holds a candle which in the then contemporary ritual will be handed to the dying woman. Above her Christ appears in a halo of light, holding his arms open to receive Mary's soul, while his palms are open to display the wounds sustained at Calvary. With this gesture, Christ identifies himself as both redeemer and conqueror of death.

The Death marks a break in van der Goes style; line has become more important, setting is eliminated and the image lacks depth and is tightly contracted with only the bed, door and the body of the Virgin giving spatial indicators. It is renowned for not showing the apostles either in the traditional idealised manner nor as conventional figure types, but instead representing each as a unique individual, displaying their grief through a range of expressions and gestures, from sorrow and despair, to empathy and compassion. Because the artist has not used traditional representation it is difficult to identify each apostle.

The work is the best known and famous of one of a number of paintings after the death of Mary attributed to van der Goes or followers. Some art historians, including Friedrich Winkler (1964), believe he painted at least three versions, although it is generally accepted that preparatory sketches made for the Bruges work were later copied reproduced as paintings by late 15th century followers. Two similar paintings in the Berlin State Museums, the National Gallery, London, are attributed as "after van der Goes". They are usually thought to be later versions of a pen on paper drawing in the Herzog Anton Ulrich Museum, Brunswick, probably a copy of an original preparatory sketch by van der Goes. These works are similar to the Bruges paintings, but show the image in reverse. Infra-red photography shows that the composition was planned a highly detailed manner before the underdrawing was applied. Art historian Lorne Campbell writes, "it is possible that the Brunswick drawing reflects one of his earliest ideas for the Bruges painting and that the Berlin, Prague and London pictures echo, however distantly, a later stage in his development of the Bruges composition.

The painting has been the subject of intense debate as to its date and meaning. Van der Goes spent the final years of his life submerged in depression. A number of art historians, including Max Friedländer, view the work as painted c. 1480 when the artist first began to display signs of mental suffering and thus view it as an expression of his illness. The artist's late life—he died in either 1482 or 1483—susceptibility to depression and insanity was discovered in 1863 in a chronicle by his contemporary Gaspar Ofhuys, who recorded a night in 1480 when van der Goes began to excitedly talk about how he was a doomed, lost soul and attempted to commit suicide and had to be forcibly held down.

This account greatly added to the painting's value in the eyes of late-19th-century painters. Vincent van Gogh mentions van der Goes three times in his letters, first in 1873 to his brother Theo, and on two more occasions when he wrote that he identified with the portrait of van der Goes in Emile Wauters's emotionally rendered 1872 painting Hugo van der Goes Undergoing Treatment at the Red Cloister. Art historian Erwin Panofsky described van der Goes as "the first artist to live up to a concept unknown to the Middle Ages but cherished by the European mind ever after, the concept of a genius both blessed and cursed with his diversity from ordinary human beings." Panofsky goes on to describe how the work's flatness represents an "irrationality of space, light, colour, [the] expression of the artist's mental illness".

Other art historians, including Dirk de Vos and Susan Koslow, reject this thesis and argue that a wholly individualised conception of the scene would not have been acceptable to the painting's commissioners. In their view the pared down and contracted manner of the work is due to a desire to "stress the solemnity of the event and its miraculous nature, van der Goes may have decided that material richness would be distracting and indecorous."

Van der Goes was a highly progressive and original artist, but at the same time heavily influenced by both contemporary and predecessor artists. Inspiration for this work can be detected in Petrus Christus' c 1457–67 Death of the Virgin and by works attributed to the workshop of Rogier van der Weyden. The painting bears striking similarity to Martin Schongauer's c 1470–75 engraving of the same name, especially in its overall tone and mood, the depiction of Mary and the representation of the apostles seated to Mary's left. Yet there are significant differences; the bed in Schongauer's engraving is canopied and the distribution of the apostles is very different in the two works. The Schongauer is dated to at latest 1475, and it is a matter of significant and at times harsh and divisive critical debate as to which work came first (see above).

See also
 Death of the Virgin

Notes

References

Sources
 Borchert, Till-Holger. The Death of the Virgin, in: Van Eyck to Durer. Borchert, Till-Holger (ed). London: Thames & Hudson, 2011. 
 Campbell, Lorne. The Fifteenth Century Netherlandish Paintings. London: National Gallery, 1998. 

1470s paintings
Paintings by Hugo van der Goes
Collections of the Groeningemuseum
Paintings depicting Jesus
van der Goes
Angels in art